The R401 road is a regional road in Ireland, linking Kinnegad in County Meath to Kildare town in County Kildare. 

Route 
The official description of the R401 from the Roads Act 1993 (Classification of Regional Roads) Order 2012  reads:

R401: Kinnegad, County Westmeath — Edenderry, County Offaly — Kildare

Between its junction with R148 at Rossan in the county of Meath and its junction with R402 at J.K.L. Street in the town of Edenderry in the county of Offaly via Park in the county of Meath: Ballyboggan Bridge at the boundary between the county of Meath and the county of Kildare: Glynn Cross and Ballygibbon in the county of Kildare: Carrick Road and Saint Conleths Road in the town of Edenderry in the county of Offaly (map of this 15.3 km segment) and between its junction with R402 at Saint Mary's Road in the town of Edenderry in the county of Offaly and its junction with R415 at Station Road in the town of Kildare in the county of Kildare via Drumcooly, Ballykilleen, Clonbullogue and Coolygagan in the county of Offaly: Ballysooghan North; Main Street and Bridge Street at Rathangan; Boherkill, Rahilla Glebe; Shraud and Bohereenagorr in the town of Kildare in the county of Kildare (map of this 27 km segment).

See also 
Roads in Ireland
National primary road
National secondary road

References 

Regional roads in the Republic of Ireland
Roads in County Meath
Roads in County Kildare
Roads in County Offaly